Franjo Benzinger (November 26, 1899 – March 29, 1991) was a Croatian pharmacist. He was born in Vukovar and finished school at the university in Zagreb, where he also became a professor in the pharmacy school. He died in Zagreb.

Sources

1899 births
Croatian pharmacists
1991 deaths
People from Vukovar